Broward County is a county in the southeastern part of Florida, located in the Miami metropolitan area. It is Florida's second-most populous county after Miami-Dade County and the 17th-most populous in the United States, with over 1.94 million residents as of the 2020 census. Its county seat and largest city is Fort Lauderdale, which had a population of 	182,760 as of 2020.

Broward County is one of the three counties that make up the Miami metropolitan area, which was home to 6.14 million people in 2020. It is also one of the most ethnically diverse counties in the entire country.

The county has 31 municipalities (including 24 incorporated cities) and many unincorporated areas. Broward County's urbanized area occupies 427.8 square miles of land. The largest portion of the county is the Conservation Area that extends to the county's Western border. The conservation area is 796.9 square miles and consists of wetlands. At its widest points, the County stretches approximately 50.3 miles east to west and approximately 27.4 miles from north to south, averaging 5 to 25 feet in elevation.

History

Native people
The earliest evidence of Native American settlement in the Miami region came from about 12,000 years ago. The first inhabitants settled on the banks of the Miami River, with the main villages on the northern banks.

The inhabitants at the time of first European contact were the Tequesta people, who controlled much of southeastern Florida, including what is now Miami-Dade County, Broward County, and the southern part of Palm Beach County. The Tequesta Indians fished, hunted, and gathered the fruit and roots of plants for food, but did not practice any form of agriculture. They buried the small bones of the deceased with the rest of the body, and put the larger bones in a box for the village people to see. The Tequesta are credited with making the Miami Circle.

Founding of Broward
Broward County was founded on April 30, 1915. It was intended to be named Everglades County, but then-Speaker of the Florida House of Representatives Ion Farris amended the bill that established the county to name it in honor of Napoleon Bonaparte Broward, governor of Florida from 1905 to 1909.

Throughout his term as governor, Broward championed Everglades drainage and was remembered for his campaign to turn the Everglades into "useful land". This opened up much of today's urban Broward County for development, first as agricultural land and later as residential. A year before Broward became governor, Dania became the first incorporated community of what is now Broward County, followed by Pompano in 1908, and Fort Lauderdale in 1911.

In 1915, Palm Beach and Dade counties contributed nearly equal portions of land to create Broward County. Dixie Highway was also completed through Broward County in 1915. In 1916, the settlement of "Zona" was renamed Davie in recognition of Robert P. Davie, a land developer who purchased a great deal of reclaimed Everglades land.

Broward County began a huge development boom after its incorporation, with the first "tourist hotel", in Fort Lauderdale, opening in 1919. A year later, developers began dredging wetlands in the county to create island communities.

Land boom and rapid growth
The year 1925 was considered the peak of the Florida land boom with Davie, Deerfield, Floranada, and Hollywood all being incorporated. By 1925, the boom was considered to have reached its peak, but the 1926 Miami hurricane caused economic depression in the county.  In 1926, the Hollywood Seminole Indian Reservation (formerly "Dania Reservation") was opened. In 1927, Lauderdale-by-the-Sea was incorporated. In 1928, the Bay Mabel Harbor (now the Port Everglades channel) was opened. In 1929, Merle Fogg Airport (now site of Fort Lauderdale-Hollywood International Airport) was dedicated. In 1939, Hillsboro Beach was incorporated. Gulfstream Park also opened in Hallandale in 1939.

The county saw another population and development boom post-World War II when the transformation from agricultural to urbanized residential area began. In 1947, Pompano merged with beach area to form the present day City of Pompano Beach.

There was another boom during the 1950s and the late 1960s. In 1953, Plantation, Lazy Lake, and Fern Crest Village were incorporated. In 1955, Margate and Miramar were incorporated. In 1956, Lighthouse Point was incorporated and the Florida Turnpike was completed through Broward County. In 1957, Pembroke Park was incorporated. In 1959, Cooper City, Lauderhill, and Sea Ranch Lakes were incorporated.

In 1946 Dr. Von D. Mizell and black business owners petitioned the County Commission to make a county beach available to African Americans; at the time the beaches in Broward County, as elsewhere in Florida, were for whites only. Eight years later a beach, today Dr. Von D. Mizell-Eula Johnson State Park, in Dania Beach, was made available, but there was no road to it until 1965. In the meantime, Mizell and Eula Johnson, with supporters, deliberately violated the law on July 4, 1961, by wading into the water on Ft. Lauderdale beach. The legal process set in motion by this incident resulted in the desegregation of Broward County beaches in 1962.

In 1960, the City of Pembroke Pines was incorporated. This same year marked the opening of Broward College (then Broward Community College).

In 1961, Lauderdale Lakes and Sunrise were incorporated. In 1963, the cities of Coral Springs, North Lauderdale, Parkland, and Tamarac were all incorporated. In 1967, Coconut Creek was incorporated.

The effects of a national recession hit the county in 1974 and the population growth finally slowed. This is from a peak growth percentage change of 297.9% which saw the population of Broward grow from 83,933 as of 1950 to 333,946 in 1960. The population subsequently experienced an 85.7% population growth which brought the population to a total of 620,100 in 1970.

Recent history
The structure of the Broward County government was signed into law in 1975 with the passage of the Broward County charter. In the same year, the Seminole Tribe of Florida incorporated as a governing entity and began organizing cigarette sales, bingo and land leases that will bring millions of dollars in annual revenue in later years. In 1976, Interstate 95 was completed through Broward County.

On January 19, 1977, snow fell in South Florida for the first time in recorded history. Snow was seen across all of South Florida as far south as Homestead and even on Miami Beach. Snow was officially reported by weather observers in West Palm Beach, LaBelle, Hollywood, and Royal Palm Ranger Station in southern Miami-Dade County.

In the year 1980, the US census reported over 1 million people living in Broward County.

On August 24, 1992, Hurricane Andrew passed through Miami-Dade County, causing $100 million in damage in Broward County and leaving at least a dozen residents homeless as a result of storm related fires. Broward became a base of operations to shuttle supplies to neighbors in devastated Dade County which suffered the brunt of the storm and caused over $25 billion in damage. Hurricane Andrew caused a massive exodus from South Dade to Broward County, filling Pembroke Pines and other Broward communities with tens of thousands of transplanted families.

In the year 2000, the US census reported a total population of 1,623,018. The town of South West Ranches was incorporated this year.

On March 1, 2005, West Park became Broward County's 31st municipality to be incorporated.

On October 24, 2005, Hurricane Wilma hit South Florida leaving the entire area damaged and causing almost universal power outages. Wilma was the most damaging storm in Broward County since Hurricane King in 1950.

On February 14, 2018, the city of Parkland became the scene of a deadly mass shooting perpetrated by a 19-year-old former student of Stoneman Douglas High School. The trial of the perpetrator of the shooting, Nikolas Cruz, was held at the Seventeenth Judicial Circuit Court of Florida in Broward County in 2022 with Judge Elizabeth Scherer presiding. Cruz was sentenced to life without the possibility of parole.

In June 2020, following the George Floyd protests, some residents called for the county to be renamed due to Governor Broward's support for segregation and the Back-to-Africa movement.

Geography

It is rather new geologically and at the eastern edge of the Florida Platform, a carbonate plateau created millions of years ago. Broward County is composed of Oolite limestone while western Broward is composed mostly of Bryozoa. Broward is among the last areas of Florida to be created and populated with fauna and flora, mostly in the Pleistocene.

Within developable land, Broward County has a population density of 3,740 per square mile (1,444 per square kilometer).

Broward approved the construction of Osborne Reef, an artificial reef made of tires off the Fort Lauderdale beach, but it has proven an environmental disaster.

Adjacent counties
 Palm Beach County - north
 Miami-Dade County - south
 Collier County - west
 Hendry County - northwest

Demographics

2015 5-Year American Community Survey

Households and families
As of the 2015 5-year ACS, Broward County had 1,843,152 people, 670,284 households, and 425,680 families. Of the 670,284 households in Broward County, 26.2% had children under the age of 18 living with them, 43% were married couples living together, 15.6% had a female householder with no husband present, and 36.5% were non-families. 29.6% of all households were made up of individuals, and 11.6% had someone living alone who was 65 years of age or older. The average household size was 2.73 and the average family size was 3.43.

Age
In the county, the population was spread out, with 21.7% under the age of 18, 8.5% from 18 to 24, 26.9% from 25 to 44, 27.7% from 45 to 64, and 15.0% who were 65 years of age or older. The median age was 40 years. For every 100 females, there were 94.4 males. For every 100 females age 18 and over, there were 98.7 males.

Race, ancestry and nationality
The racial makeup of the county was 62.3% White, 30% Black or African American, 17.1% Hispanic or Latino of any race, 5.07% Asian, 2.20% from two or more races, 0.66% Native American, 0.16% Pacific Islander, and 0.20% from some other race. The racial makeup of the total Hispanic and Latino population in Broward County was: 65.8% White, 5.90% Native American, 2.06% Black or African American, 0.33% Asian, 0.86% Pacific Islander, 26.23% were some other race and 4.57% were from two or more races. In 2015, with relation to ancestry (excluding the various Hispanic and Latino ancestries), 7.38% were Italian, 7.70% American, 6.44% German, 6.54% Irish, 3.8% English, 2.6% Polish and 2.2% Russian ancestry. Also, among West Indians, 6.33% were Haitian and 5.96% were Jamaican. In 2015, 32.2% of the county's population was foreign born, with 18.14% being naturalized American citizens. Of foreign born residents, 78.9% were born in Latin America, 7.88% were born in Europe, 8.52% born in Asia, 3.11% in North America, 1.34% born in Africa and 0.15 were born in Oceania.

Income
As of the 2015 5-year ACS, the median income for a household in the county was $51,968, and the median income for a family was $61,809. Of full-time workers, males had a median income of $46,372 versus $39,690 for females. The per capita income for the county was $28,381. About 11.2% of families and 14.5% of the population were below the poverty line, including 19.9% of those under the age 18 and 12.6% of those aged 65 or over.

2010 Census
U.S. Census Bureau 2010 Ethnic/Race Demographics:
 White (non-Hispanic) : 42.5% (8.7% Irish, 8.2% Italian, 7.9% German, 5.0% English, 3.2% Polish, 2.7% Russian, 1.9% French, 1.0% Scottish, 0.8% Dutch, 0.8% Scotch-Irish, 0.8% Hungarian, 0.6% Swedish, 0.6% French Canadian, 0.5% Greek) (63.1% when including White Hispanics)
 Black (non-Hispanic) (26.7% when including Black Hispanics): 17.7% African Americans (12.8% Afro-Caribbean American [5.7% Haitian, 5.3% Jamaican, 0.4% Trinidadian and Tobagonian, 0.4% Other or Unspecified Afro-Caribbean, 0.3% Bahamian, 0.2% British West Indian, 0.1% Barbadian, and 0.8% Subsaharan African)
 Hispanic or Latino of any race: 26.9% (4.8% Cuban, 4.3% Puerto Rican, 3.8% Colombian, 1.7% Mexican, 1.6% Dominican, 1.4% Peruvian, 1.3% Venezuelan, 0.7% Ecuadoran, 0.7% Honduran, 0.6% Argentinean, 0.5% Nicaraguan, 0.5% Salvadoran)
 Asian: 3.2% (1.2% South Asian including Indians, Indo-Caribbeans, Pakistanis, Bangladeshis, Sri Lankans, Nepalese, and Bhutanese, 0.6% Chinese (Han Chinese and Chinese Americans), including Chinese Caribbeans and Han Taiwanese Americans, 0.5% Other Asian, 0.4% Filipino, 0.3% Vietnamese, 0.1% Japanese, 0.1% Korean)
 Two or more races: 2.9%
 American Indian and Alaska Native: 0.3%
 Native Hawaiian and Other Pacific Islander: 0.1%
 Other Races: 3.7% (0.7% Arab)

In 2010, 4.7% of the population considered themselves to be of only "American" ancestry (regardless of race or ethnicity.)

, Haitians made up the largest population of immigrants, with Jamaicans coming in second, Colombians in third, followed by Cuban exiled refugees in fourth place, then Peruvians, Venezuelans, Brazilians, Dominicans, Canadians, and Mexicans being the tenth highest group of expatriates. The county also houses many British, French, German, and Spanish expatriates.

There were 810,388 households, out of which 28.61% had children under the age of 18 living with them, 42.80% were married couples living together, 15.28% had a female householder with no husband present, and 36.67% were non-families. 28.79% of all households were made up of individuals, and 11.07% (3.31% male and 7.76% female) had someone living alone who was 65 years of age or older. The average household size was 2.52 and the average family size was 3.14.

The age distribution is 22.4% under the age of 18, 8.4% from 18 to 24, 27.2% from 25 to 44, 27.7% from 45 to 64, and 14.3% who were 65 years of age or older. The median age was 39.7 years. For every 100 females, there were 93.9 males. For every 100 females age 18 and over, there were 91.0 males.

The median income for a household in the county was $51,694, and the median income for a family was $62,619. Males had a median income of $44,935 versus $36,813 for females. The per capita income for the county was $28,631. About 9.1% of families and 12.3% of the population were below the poverty line, including 16.2% of those under age 18 and 12.2% of those aged 65 or over.

In 2010, 30.9% of the county's population was foreign born, with 49.2% being naturalized American citizens. Of foreign born residents, 77.4% were born in Latin America, 9.0% were born in Europe, 8.4% born in Asia, 3.5% in North America, 1.6% born in Africa, and 0.1% were born in Oceania.

According to the 2010 U.S. Census, Broward County is the 9th largest county with same sex households. As of the 2010 Census, there were 9,125 same sex households out of a total of 686,047 households (1.33%).

2000 Census
As of the census of 2000, there were 1,623,018 people, 654,445 households, and 411,645 families residing in the county. The racial makeup of the county was 70.57% White (58% were Non-Hispanic), 20.54% Black or African American, 0.24% Native American, 2.25% Asian, 0.06% Pacific Islander, 3.00% from other races, and 3.35% from two or more races. 16.74% of the population were Hispanic or Latino of any race.

In 2000, with relation to ancestry (excluding the various Hispanic and Latino ancestries), 9.4% were Italian, 7.4% American, 6.8% German, 6.7% Irish, and 4% English ancestry. Also, among West Indians, 5.99% were Haitian and were 5.91% Jamaican. Broward was the only county in the nation outside the Northeast in which Italian-Americans formed the largest ethnic group in 2000. They are concentrated mainly in the Pompano Beach area.

There were 654,445 households, out of which 29.30% had children under the age of 18 living with them, 46.1% were married couples living together, 12.5% had a female householder with no husband present, and 37.1% were non-families. 29.6% of all households were made up of individuals, and % had someone living alone who was 65 years of age or older. The average household size was 2.45 and the average family size was 3.07.

In the county, the population was spread out, with 23.6% under the age of 18, 7.2% from 18 to 24, 31.4% from 25 to 44, 21.7% from 45 to 64, and 16.1% who were 65 years of age or older. The median age was 38 years. For every 100 females, there were 93.3 males. For every 100 females age 18 and over, there were 89.8 males.

The median income for a household in the county was $41,691, and the median income for a family was $50,531. Males had a median income of $36,741 versus $28,529 for females. The per capita income for the county was $23,170. About 8.7% of families and 11.5% of the population were below the poverty line, including 15.3% of those under age 18 and 10.0% of those age 65 or over.

As of 2005, Broward County led the nation's metropolitan areas in new AIDS diagnoses, with a reported rate 58.4 new AIDS diagnoses per 100,000 people. County officials think the numbers may stem from a new and successful HIV testing campaign that has resulted in many people being diagnosed with AIDS at the same time they've been diagnosed with HIV. Without the implementation of the new testing campaign, the reported numbers of new diagnoses would have probably been lower.

Languages
, 63.44% of all residents spoke English as their first language, while 22.22% spoke Spanish, 5.42% French Creole (mostly Haitian Creole), 1.48% Portuguese, 1.41% French, and 0.59% of the population spoke Italian as their mother language. In total, 36.56% of the population spoke languages other than English as their primary language. Since many immigrants are coming from the Anglophone Caribbean, where English is spoken, the change is not as fast as the rate of immigration would suggest.

Law, government, and politics

The Broward County Charter provides for a separation between the legislative and administrative functions of government. The Board of County Commissioners is the legislative branch of Broward County Government. The County Commission is composed of nine members elected by district. Commissioners must be a resident of the district where they seek election. Each year the Commission elects a mayor and vice mayor. The mayor's functions include serving as presiding officer, and as the county's official representative. The Commission appoints the County Administrator, County Attorney and County Auditor. The commission also appoints numerous advisory and regulatory boards.

The County Commission meets in formal session the first four Tuesdays of each month at 10:00 a.m. in Room 422 of the Broward County Governmental Center. Over 507,000 cable subscribers in Broward County have access to Government-access television (GATV) coverage of Commission meetings, which are broadcast live beginning at 10:00 a.m. each Tuesday, and rebroadcast at 5:30 p.m. the following Friday. Meetings can also be viewed via webcasting at www.broward.org.

The Broward County Sheriff's Office (BSO) has 5,400 employees, and is the largest sheriff's department in Florida. The BSO was founded in 1915. Sheriff Gregory Tony has been the Sheriff heading the agency since 2019, when he replaced Sheriff Scott Israel, who had been Sheriff since 2013.

Politics

Overview
Broward County has been a Democratic stronghold since 1992, voting for the Party's presidential nominee in every election since then. It is now considered one of the most reliably Democratic counties in the state, giving greater than 60% support to the party nominee in every election since 1996. From 1948 to 1988, the county leaned Republican, voting for the Republican nominee in every election except 1976, even supporting Republican Barry Goldwater by a 56-44 margin while he lost the national election in a landslide. This change in voting tendencies can be attributed to the large migrations of middle and upper-class snowbirds and transplants from more liberal northern states, suburban flight from liberal voters leaving Miami-Dade County (many of whom themselves had roots in the North), a growing LGBT community, the increased salience of social issues such as abortion and gun control among educated voters, and immigration from places such as Latin America, the Caribbean, Canada, Europe, and Asia. Unlike Miami-Dade County to the south, where many of the immigrants are Republican-leaning Cuban-Americans, Cubans comprise only a small proportion of the immigrant population in Broward County.

Voter registration
According to the Secretary of State's office, Democrats maintain a majority among registered voters in Broward County. The county is also one of the few counties in the state where Independents outnumber Republicans.

Ordinances
Broward's code of ordinances consists of resolutions, administrative rules and regulations passed in order to secure a responsive and efficient form of local government.

The county maintains a distinctive rule regarding communication between the county and bidders for county contracts, known as the Cone of Silence. This rule prevents staff involved in a purchasing process from communicating with bidders from the time when the solicitation is issued, and County Commissioners from the time when bids are opened, until the vote to award the contract or the time when all bids are rejected.

Economy

Silver Airways has its headquarters on the property of Fort Lauderdale-Hollywood International Airport in an unincorporated area.
 Other companies with headquarters in unincorporated areas include Locair.

Spirit Airlines has its headquarters in Miramar.

When Chalk's International Airlines existed, its headquarters was on the grounds of the airport in an unincorporated area. When Bimini Island Air existed, its headquarters were in an unincorporated area.

By far the largest agricultural sector is nurseries, greenhouses, floricultures, and sod. This supplies ornamental uses in the area.

Education

Primary and secondary schools

Broward County Schools, the sole school district in the county, has the sixth largest school district in the country and the second largest in the state after the Miami-Dade district.

Regionally accredited colleges and universities
 Broward College
 Florida Atlantic University (Branch campuses)
 Nova Southeastern University
 Keiser University

Other adult education providers
 DeVry University
 University of Phoenix
 The Art Institute of Fort Lauderdale
 Florida Career College
 Brown Mackie College
 Atlantic Technical Center and Technical High School
 McFatter Technical College and Technical High School
 Sheridan Technical College and Technical High School

Public libraries
The Broward County Library is one of the largest public library systems in the country, comprising 38 branch locations. There are also five municipal public libraries in the county that are not part of the Broward County Library system: Ethel M. Gordon Oakland Park Library, Lighthouse Point Library, Helen B. Hoffman Plantation Library, Richard C. Sullivan Public Library of Wilton Manors, and Parkland Public Library.

Library Resources
Broward County libraries provide endless amount of resources to the public. For high-schoolers looking to prepare themselves for college, the library offers college readiness & SAT/ACT prep courses. For adults looking to learn computer skills, adult computer classes are also offered. These resources are free of cost, therefore, all it takes is registering to participate. In addition to the many resources offered at the library, bus passes are also sold at most Broward County libraries. If you want to enjoy some of these resources, you can simply download the app to utilize them on the go. There are nine apps available for download: Broward County Library (BCL WoW), Freegal Music, Hoopla, Overdrive, Libby, Axis 360, RBdigital Magazines, Rosetta Stone, and Brainfuse.

Sites of interest

Museums and historical collections

 African-American Research Library and Cultural Center, Fort Lauderdale
 Bonnet House Museum & Gardens, Fort Lauderdale
 Coral Springs Museum of Art, Coral Springs
 Fort Lauderdale Antique Car Museum, Fort Lauderdale
 Fort Lauderdale History Center, Fort Lauderdale
 Naval Air Station Fort Lauderdale Museum, Fort Lauderdale
 NSU Art Museum, Fort Lauderdale
 Plantation Historical Museum, Plantation
 Stranahan House, Fort Lauderdale
 The International Game Fish Association, including the Fishing Hall of Fame & Museum, Dania Beach
 The International Swimming Hall of Fame, Fort Lauderdale
 The Museum of Discovery and Science, Fort Lauderdale
 Wiener Museum of Decorative Arts, Dania Beach
 Young at Art Museum, Davie

Nature and wildlife areas

 Anne Kolb Nature Center, Hollywood
 Butterfly World, a botanical sanctuary in Coconut Creek
 Everglades Holiday Park, featuring airboat rides and alligator shows
 Fern Forest Nature Center, Coconut Creek
 Flamingo Gardens, a botanical garden and wildlife sanctuary
 Secret Woods Nature Center, Dania Beach
 Sawgrass Recreation Park

Other areas and attractions

 Beach Place, a strip of stores, restaurants, and bars across the street from the beach along the Atlantic coast, in Fort Lauderdale
 Broward Center for the Performing Arts
 Hollywood Beach Broadwalk
 Florida Grand Opera
 Fort Lauderdale Swap Shop (colloquially known to locals as simply the Swap Shop)
 Sawgrass Mills, a large outlet shopping mall in Sunrise
 FLA Live Arena in Sunrise, where the NHL's Florida Panthers play their games
 The Festival Flea Market Mall in Pompano Beach, America's largest indoor flea market
 Riverwalk (Fort Lauderdale)

Additionally, with 23 miles of beach, Broward County is a popular destination for scuba diving, snorkeling, and droves of young Spring break tourists from around the world.

Transportation

Airports

Fort Lauderdale–Hollywood International Airport serves as the primary airport of the Broward County area. The airport is near cruise line terminals at Port Everglades and is popular among tourists bound for the Caribbean. Since the late 1990s, FLL has become an intercontinental gateway, although Miami International Airport still handles most long-haul flights. FLL is ranked as the 19th busiest airport (in terms of passenger traffic) in the United States, as well as the nation's 14th busiest international air gateway and one of the world's 50 busiest airports. FLL is classified by the US Federal Aviation Administration as a "major hub" facility serving commercial air traffic. In 2017 the airport processed 32,511,053 passengers (11.3% more than 2016) including 7,183,275 international passengers (18.6% more than 2016).
 North Perry Airport
 Fort Lauderdale Executive Airport
 Pompano Beach Airpark
 Downtown Fort Lauderdale Heliport

Public transportation
 Broward County Transit
 Sun Trolley

Major expressways

  Interstate 95
  Interstate 75
  Interstate 595 (Port Everglades Expressway)
  Florida's Turnpike (SR 91)
  Homestead Extension (SR 821)
  State Road 869 (Sawgrass Expressway)

Railroads
 Amtrak, Brightline and Tri-Rail run through Broward. Also Florida East Coast Railway (FEC) Freight

Street grid
A street grid stretches throughout Broward County. Most of this grid is loosely based on three primary eastern municipalities, (from South to North) Hollywood, Fort Lauderdale, and Pompano Beach. Deerfield Beach—another primary eastern municipality—has its own street grid, as do two smaller municipalities—Dania Beach and Hallandale Beach.

Greenways System
Construction is underway on a network of recreational trails to connect cities and points of interest in the county.

Communities

Municipalities
Municipality populations are based on the 2020 US Census using their QuickFacts with 5,000 residents and above, while municipalities under 5,000 people are based on their US Decennial Census.

Former unincorporated neighborhoods
In the 1980s the Broward County Commission adopted a policy of having all populated places in the county be part of a municipality. Municipalities were often reluctant to annex neighborhoods which were not projected to yield enough tax revenue to cover the costs of providing services to those neighborhoods. In 2001 the Broward County Legislative Delegation adopted a policy encouraging the annexation of all unincorporated areas in Broward County into municipalities by October 1, 2005. Formerly unincorporated neighborhoods that have been annexed into existing municipalities or combined to form new municipalities  include:

Remaining unincorporated neighborhoods 
By late in the first decade of the 21st century, annexation of remaining neighborhoods had stalled.  the Broward County Municipal Services District serves seven unincorporated neighborhoods, including six census designated places (Boulevard Gardens, Broadview Park, Franklin Park, Hillsboro Pines, Roosevelt Gardens and Washington Park) and a parcel with a population of 72 in 2018, Hillsboro Ranches. Other areas in the developed part of the county that are not in municipalities include the Hollywood Seminole Indian Reservation, Fort Lauderdale-Hollywood International Airport, several landfills and resource recovery facilities, and other scattered small parcels with few or no residents.

See also
 List of tallest buildings in Fort Lauderdale
 National Register of Historic Places listings in Broward County, Florida
 List of counties in Florida

References

External links

Government links/Constitutional offices
 Broward County Government / Board of County Commissioners
 Broward County Supervisor of Elections
 Broward County Property Appraiser
 Broward County Sheriff's Office

Special districts
 Broward County Public Schools
 Broward Health (formerly North Broward Hospital District)
 South Broward Hospital District(Memorial Healthcare System)
 Broward Soil and Water Conservation District
 South Florida Water Management District

Judicial branch
 Broward County Clerk of Courts
 Broward County Clerk of Courts Records
 Broward County Public Defender
 Broward State Attorney's Office, 17th Judicial Circuit 
 Circuit and County Court for the 17th Judicial Circuit of Florida

Tourism links
 Greater Fort Lauderdale Convention and Visitors Bureau
 The Waterfront News local newspaper for Broward County, Florida fully and openly available in the Florida Digital Newspaper Library

Official sites
 The Broward Alliance (Broward County's official public/private partnership for economic development)

 
1915 establishments in Florida
Populated places established in 1915
Charter counties in Florida
Counties in the Miami metropolitan area
Florida counties